"Scary" is a song by English rapper Stormzy. It was released as a single independently on 2 September 2016. The song peaked at number 169 on the UK Singles Chart.

Music video
A music video to accompany the release of "Scary" was first released onto YouTube on 25 April 2016.

Charts

Certifications

Release history

References

2016 songs
2016 singles
Stormzy songs
Songs written by Stormzy